Kolana lyde is a butterfly in the family Lycaenidae. It was described by Frederick DuCane Godman and Osbert Salvin in 1887. It is found in Guatemala, Panama and Mexico.

References

Butterflies described in 1887
Eumaeini
Taxa named by Frederick DuCane Godman
Taxa named by Osbert Salvin
Butterflies of Central America